Brown Sugar is a 2002 American romantic comedy film written by Michael Elliott and Rick Famuyiwa, directed by Famuyiwa, and starring Taye Diggs and Sanaa Lathan. The film is a story of a lifelong friends, A&R Andre and Editor-in-Chief Sidney. The two can attribute their friendship and the launch of their careers to a single, seminal childhood moment – the day they discovered hip-hop on a New York street corner. Now some 15 years later, as they lay down the tracks toward their futures, hip-hop isn't the only thing that keeps them coming back to that moment on the corner.

The movie was released in the US on October 11, 2002, and ran for 16 weeks, grossing $27,363,891 domestically and $952,560 in the foreign sector for a worldwide total of $28,316,451.

Plot
Childhood friends Sidney (Sanaa Lathan) and Dre (Taye Diggs), who originally bonded over their love of hip-hop, face an evolving relationship as adults. Sidney has just been appointed the editor-in-chief of the hip hop magazine XXL, and Dre is an A&R for Millennium Records. While Sidney's career is flourishing, Dre is increasingly frustrated with his label's preference for marketable artists over true talent.

Dre meets and falls in love with Reese (Nicole Ari Parker), a successful entertainment attorney, and soon becomes engaged to her.  The night before Dre's wedding, he and Sidney kiss and almost have sex, but they stop themselves. At the wedding, Sidney's cousin Francine (Queen Latifah) deduces the romantic tension between Sidney and Dre and encourages her to object during the ceremony. She does not and Dre settles into married life with Reese. Sidney, meanwhile, begins dating professional athlete Kelby Dawson (Boris Kodjoe).

Dre sees Cavi (Mos Def), a rapper who works as a taxi driver during the day, perform and is impressed with his talent, but Cavi isn't interested in signing with Dre's label because he doesn't like the music they produce. Dre's boss meanwhile pushes him to manage an untalented but commercially viable rap group, forcing him to choose between his income and his love of hip hop. He decides to quit and form his own label, focusing on bringing back the real hip hop that his generation fell in love with, and manages to sign Cavi.

Reese is unsupportive of Dre's new business venture, concerned it will fail and they will be forced to live in reduced circumstances. Meanwhile, Sidney draws closer to Dre due to their partnership in the label, and Reese develops jealousy over Dre and Sidney's friendship, while Cavi falls for Francine but struggles to muster the courage to ask her out.

Sidney also grows closer to Kelby, who proposes to her. Dre tells her he's against her marrying Kelby because he thinks he's inauthentic. Sidney doesn't agree, but begins to have doubts when she discovers that Kelby doesn't read her articles.

When Dre discovers Reese has been cheating with a man from the gym, he brings Sid to catch her in the act. This leads to a night of shared passion between Dre and Sid and opens Sid's eyes to the fact she is not prepared to marry Kelby. She calls off the engagement and while searching for Dre sees Reese and Dre in a parting embrace that she misconstrues as more.

While at Hot 97 waiting for Cavi's first single to play on the Angie Martinez show, Dre hears Sid talking about her new book I Used to Love H.I.M. Though based on her love affair with hip-hop, it really is a chronicled timeline of her love affair with Dre. He recognizes this and rushes over to the station to confront his feelings, as well. Meanwhile, in the production booth, Cavi stumbles in trying to ask Francine out again. She recognizes their attraction and asks him out on a date.

The film ends with Cavi's song playing in the same park where their love of hip-hop began.

Cast
Taye Diggs — Andre Romulus 'Dre' Ellis
Marc John Jefferies - Young Dre Ellis
Sanaa Lathan — Sidney 'Sid' Shaw, Dre's best friend
 Aaliyyah Hill - Young Sidney
Mos Def — Christopher Anton 'Cavi' Vichon, a cabby (and secret rapper) who later befriends Dre 
Nicole Ari Parker — Reese Marie Wiggam Ellis, an attorney who later marries Dre
Boris Kodjoe — Kelby Dawson, an NBA star who Sid meets and starts dating
Queen Latifah — Francine, Sid's cousin
Wendell Pierce - Simon, Dre's boss at Millennium Records
Erik Weiner — Ren, half of The Hip Hop Dalmatians
 Reggi Wyns - Ten, half of The Hip Hop Dalmatians
 Venida Evans - Aunt Betty
 Liza Lapira - Hot 97 Receptionist
 Wyking Jones - Bartender

cameo appearances
Big Daddy Kane - Himself
Kool G Rap — Himself
Pete Rock — Himself
De La Soul — Themselves
Tariq Trotter aka Black Thought — Himself
Jermaine Dupri — Himself
Talib Kweli — Himself
Common - Himself
Method Man - Himself
Slick Rick - Freestyler
Dana Dane - Freestyler
Jen Taylor - Boathouse Attendant 
Doug E. Fresh - Beatboxer
Ahmir Thompson aka Questlove - Himself 
Russell Simmons - Himself
Fabolous - Himself
Beanie Sigel - Himself
Angie Martinez - Herself
Kimora Lee - Herself

Critical reception 
Brown Sugar received generally positive reviews from critics. On Rotten Tomatoes, the film has an approval rating of 66% based on 88 reviews, with an average rating of 6.2/10. The site's critical consensus reads, "Though predictable and possibly too sweet, Brown Sugar is charming, well-acted, and smarter than typical rom-com fare." On Metacritic, the film holds a score of 58 out of 100, indicating "mixed or average reviews". Audiences polled by CinemaScore gave the film an average grade of "A" on an A+ to F scale.

In the Chicago Sun-Times, Roger Ebert gave Brown Sugar three out of four stars and said it was "more like a slice of black professional life" than a rap comedy, a film thoughtful about its characters, who he said were as deep and complex as those in Terry McMillan novels. Dave Kehr of The New York Times praised the film, saying it "sustains the charm of an early 60's New York romance," and noted that "It resembles one of those films like Peter Tewksbury's Sunday in New York or Vincente Minnelli's Courtship of Eddie's Father, in which the city is a wonderfully bright, benign, fulfilling place and nothing really bad could ever happen."

Awards and nominations
2003 NAACP Image Awards (nominations)
Outstanding Motion Picture
Outstanding Actor in a Motion Picture — Taye Diggs
Outstanding Actress in a Motion Picture — Sanaa Lathan
Outstanding Supporting Actor in a Motion Picture — Mos Def
Outstanding Supporting Actor in a Motion Picture — Boris Kodjoe
Outstanding Supporting Actress in a Motion Picture — Queen Latifah
Outstanding Supporting Actress in a Motion Picture — Nicole Ari Parker

Soundtrack

A soundtrack containing hip hop and R&B music was released on September 24, 2002, by MCA Records. It peaked at #16 on the Billboard 200 and #2 on the Top R&B/Hip-Hop Albums.

References

External links

2002 films
2002 romantic drama films
2000s hip hop films
African-American films
American coming-of-age films
American romantic drama films
Fox Searchlight Pictures films
Films directed by Rick Famuyiwa
2000s English-language films
2000s American films